The 2012–13 United Counties League season (known as the 2012–13 ChromaSport & Trophies United Counties League for sponsorship reasons) was the 106th in the history of the United Counties League, a football competition in England.

Premier Division

The Premier Division featured 17 clubs which competed in the division last season, along with four new clubs.
Clubs promoted from Division One:
Harborough Town
Huntingdon Town
Clubs relegated from the Northern Premier League:
Quorn
Shepshed Dynamo

From this league, only Quorn, St Ives Town and Spalding United applied for promotion.

League table

Results

Division One

Division One featured 14 clubs which competed in the division last season, along with five new clubs:
AFC Rushden & Diamonds, a new club formed after Rushden & Diamonds folded
Harrowby United, a re-formed club
Northampton Spencer, voluntarily demoted from the Premier Division
Oadby Town, transferred from the East Midlands Counties League
Thrapston Town, relegated from the Premier Division

League table

Results

References

External links
 United Counties League

9
United Counties League seasons